The Mon-Dak Conference (MDC) is a junior college conference for eight Tech and Community Colleges located in Montana and North Dakota, and it is a conference in the National Junior College Athletic Association (NJCAA). Conference championships are held in most sports and some individuals can be named to All-Conference and All-Academic teams.

Member schools

Current members
The Mon-Dak currently has eight full members, all but one are public schools:

Notes

See also
National Junior College Athletic Association (NJCAA)
Minnesota College Athletic Conference, also in NJCAA Region 13

External links
 Mon-Dak Conference Website
 NJCAA Website

NJCAA conferences
College sports in Montana
College sports in North Dakota